KCCU (89.3 FM), is a National Public Radio member radio station in Lawton, Oklahoma, owned by Cameron University.

Repeaters

External links
 KCCU official website

 

NPR member stations
CCU